Argyrochosma is a genus of ferns known commonly as false cloak ferns. The genus is included in the Cheilanthoideae subfamily of the Pteridaceae.  Species now in this genus were previously treated as members of related genera Notholaena or Pellaea but were segregated into their own genus in 1987. These ferns, of which there are about 20 species, are mostly native to the Americas, from North to South and including the Caribbean, while one species, A. connectens, is known from Sichuan, China. They are commonly found growing in cracks between rocks. Their leaves are generally shorter than 40 centimeters and have rounded bluish or grayish green segments. Often the lower surface of the segments is coated in a white dust, and the sporangia contain brown spores.

Species
, the Checklist of Ferns and Lycophytes of the World recognized the following species:
Argyrochosma chilensis (Fée ex J.Rémy) Windham
Argyrochosma connectens (C.Chr.) G.M.Zhang
Argyrochosma dealbata (Pursh) Windham - powdery false cloak fern
Argyrochosma delicatula (Maxon & Weath.) Windham
Argyrochosma fendleri (Kunze) Windham - Fendler's false cloak fern
Argyrochosma flava (Hook.) M.Kessler & A.R.Sm.
Argyrochosma formosa (Liebm.) Windham
Argyrochosma incana (C.Presl) Windham - hairy false cloak fern
Argyrochosma jonesii (Maxon) Windham - Jones' false cloak fern
Argyrochosma limitanea (Maxon) Windham - southwestern false cloak fern
Argyrochosma lumholtzii (Maxon & Weath.) Windham
Argyrochosma microphylla (Mett. ex Kuhn) Windham - small-leaf false cloak fern
Argyrochosma nivea (Poir.) Windham
Argyrochosma pallens (Weath. ex R.M.Tryon) Windham
Argyrochosma palmeri (Baker) Windham
Argyrochosma peninsularis (Maxon & Weath.) Windham
Argyrochosma pilifera (R.M.Tryon) Windham
Argyrochosma stuebeliana (Hieron.) Windham
Argyrochosma tenera (Gillies Hook.) M.Kessler & A.R.Sm.

References

External links

Jepson Manual Treatment
USDA Plants Profile

Further reading

 
Fern genera